Osvaldo Martínez may refer to:

 Osvaldo Martínez, Paraguayan footballer
 Osvaldo Martínez (baseball), Puerto Rican baseball player
 Osvaldo Martinez (gymnast) (born 1985), Argentine gymnast; see Gymnastics at the 2018 South American Games